Can Maxim Mutaf (born January 9, 1991) is a Turkish professional basketball player for ONVO Büyükçekmece of the Basketbol Süper Ligi (BSL).

Professional career
Mutaf began his career with Fenerbahçe Istanbul in the 2006–07 season. It was around this time that he became the second-youngest player in Euroleague history to start there, behind only Aleksandar Ugrinoski in terms of age. He spent the 2009–10 season on loan with FMV Isiskspor Istanbul in the Turkish 2nd Division. In 2011, he moved to Mersin BB.

He returned to Fenerbahçe  Istanbul for the 2012–13 season. In January 2013, he joined Pınar Karşıyaka. For the 2013–14 season, he moved to Trabzonspor.

He then joined Banvit in 2014. In 2016, he moved to Anadolu Efes. In July 2017, he signed with Beşiktaş.

On November 6, 2019, he has signed with Bursaspor of the Turkish Basketball League (BSL). Mutaf re-signed with the team on July 16, 2020.

On June 23, 2021, he has signed with Darüşşafaka of the Basketball Super League.

On June 26, 2022, he has signed with Büyükçekmece Basketbol of the Basketbol Süper Ligi (BSL).

International career
Mutaf was a regular member of the junior national teams of Turkey. With the Turkish junior national teams, he played at the following tournaments: the 2007 FIBA Europe Under-16 Championship, the 2008 FIBA Europe Under-18 Championship, the 2009 FIBA Europe Under-18 Championship, where he won a bronze medal, the 2010 FIBA Europe Under-20 Championship, and at the 2011 FIBA Europe Under-20 Championship.

He has also been a member of the senior men's Turkish national basketball team.

Personal life
Mutaf has a Turkish father and a Russian mother, and he also has Russian citizenship. He is married to Turkish internet celebrity Duygu Özaslan.

See also 
 List of youngest EuroLeague players

References

External links
Euroleague.net Profile
FIBA Profile (archive)
Eurobasket.com Profile
TBlStat.net Profile

1991 births
Living people
Anadolu Efes S.K. players
Bandırma B.İ.K. players
Beşiktaş men's basketball players
Bursaspor Basketbol players
Büyükçekmece Basketbol players
Competitors at the 2013 Mediterranean Games
Darüşşafaka Basketbol players
Fenerbahçe men's basketball players
Karşıyaka basketball players
Mediterranean Games gold medalists for Turkey
Mediterranean Games medalists in basketball
Mersin Büyükşehir Belediyesi S.K. players
Russian men's basketball players
Russian people of Turkish descent
Shooting guards
Small forwards
Basketball players from Istanbul
Trabzonspor B.K. players
Turkish men's basketball players
Turkish people of Russian descent